The 2014 Cork Intermediate Hurling Championship was the 105th staging of the Cork Intermediate Hurling Championship since its establishment by the Cork County Board in 1909. The draw for the opening rounds took place on 14 December 2014. The championship began on 31 May 2014 and ended on 26 October 2014.

On 26 October 2014, Fermoy won the championship following a 2-14 to 1-16 defeat of Charleville in the final at Páirc Uí Chaoimh. This was their first championship title in the grade. St. Catherine's returned to the junior grade for the first time in 31 years after suffering a two-point defeat by Dripsey in a relegation play-off.

Kildorrery's Peter O'Brien was the championship's top scorer with 1-47.

Team changes

To Championship

Promoted from the Cork Junior A Hurling Championship
 Grenagh

Relegated from the Cork Premier Intermediate Hurling Championship
 Ballincollig

From Championship

Promoted to the Cork Premier Intermediate Hurling Championship
 Kanturk

Relegated to the North Cork Junior A Hurling Championship
 Dromina

Results

First round

Second round

Third round

Relegation playoff

Fourth round

 Aghada and Meelin received byes in this round.

Quarter-finals

Semi-finals

Final

Championship statistics

Top scorers

Overall

In a single game

References

Cork Intermediate Hurling Championship
Cork Intermediate Hurling Championship